Charles Shriver Reifsnider (November 27, 1875 – March 16, 1958) was the Anglican bishop of North Tokyo in the Nippon Sei Ko Kai from 1935 to 1940.  During his mission years in Japan from 1904 to 1941 he also served as the President of Rikkyo University from 1912 to 1940.

Early life and career
Reifsnider  was born November 27, 1875 in Frederick, Maryland, the son of Charles D. Reifsnider and Elizabeth Shriver. His grandfather was the Union General, Edward Shriver. Reifsnider was educated at Heidelberg University, and Bexley Hall seminary, graduating from Kenyon College prior ordination in 1901.

Reifsnider served as an Anglican missionary in Japan under the auspices of the Domestic and Foreign Missionary Society of the Episcopal Church. He served as suffragan bishop of North Tokyo from 1924 to 1935, and on Bishop McKim's retirement, as bishop for the same diocese from 1935 to 1940.  As well as serving as President of Rikkyo University he also served as President of St. Margaret's College from 1935 to 1941.

Apart from his church mission and educational work, Reifsnider was noted for his outspoken criticism of the Immigration Act of 1924 that sought to impose quotas on Japanese immigration into the United States.

In the early 1930s Reifsnider was also reported as being initially supportive of the Japanese invasion of Manchuria, arguing that what Japan had done in Manchuria should be likened to French actions in Morocco, Italian actions in Tripoli and US actions in Panama.

In 1942, following the expulsion of non-Japanese missionaries from Japan and the outbreak of hostilities after the Attack on Pearl Harbor, Reifsnider was appointed by Presiding Bishop Henry St. George Tucker to oversee the nine Japanese-American congregations in the Episcopal Church USA.  Reifsnider, through church ministry and a combination of organizational and political skill, did much to support Japanese Episcopalian church leaders and their congregations interned during the war under Executive Order 9066.

Reifsnider retired from formal church ministry in 1947 and died in Pasadena, California on March 16, 1958.

References

Bishops of the Episcopal Church (United States)
Anglican Church in Japan
Academic staff of Rikkyo University
1875 births
1958 deaths
Japanese Anglican bishops
Anglican bishops of North Tokyo